The UHL Best Goaltender (prior to 1997 was Colonial Hockey League Best Goaltender of the Year) was awarded annually to the best goaltender in the United Hockey League (UHL) as selected by league general managers, head coaches, and members of the media. .

List of winners

References

Awards established in 1991
United Hockey League trophies and awards
1991 establishments in North America